Bernd Hollerbach (born 8 December 1969) is a German football coach and a former player who manages Sint-Truiden. From 2007 to 2012 he worked as an assistant coach to his former Hamburger SV boss Felix Magath.

Career statistics

Honours
Hamburger SV
DFB-Ligapokal: 2003

References

External links

1969 births
Living people
Sportspeople from Würzburg
German footballers
Footballers from Bavaria
Association football midfielders
Bundesliga players
2. Bundesliga players
Würzburger Kickers players
FC St. Pauli players
1. FC Kaiserslautern players
Hamburger SV players
German football managers
Bundesliga managers
3. Liga managers
VfB Lübeck managers
Würzburger Kickers managers
Hamburger SV managers
Royal Excel Mouscron managers
Sint-Truidense V.V. managers
German expatriate football managers
German expatriate sportspeople in Belgium
Expatriate football managers in Belgium